Major Iván Castro (born 1967) is a U.S. Army officer who has continued serving on active duty in the Special Forces despite losing his eyesight. He is one of three blind active duty officers who serves in the U.S. Army and the only blind officer serving in the United States Army Special Forces. Castro currently serves on active duty at the Special Operations Recruiting Battalion as the Assistant Operations Officer /Total Army Involvement Recruiting Coordinator. He is an advocate of rehabilitation, employment and education for those wounded in combat and participates in various races and marathons as a contestant.

Early years

Castro was born in Hoboken, New Jersey to parents who were originally from Puerto Rico. In 1979, when he was 12 years old, he moved to Puerto Rico with his mother. After graduating from Antilles Military Academy, Castro attended the University of Puerto Rico on an athletic scholarship. During his student years he represented his alma mater in track and field and cross country competitions. After four years of college, Castro enlisted in the US Army as a Private First Class and reached the rank of Sergeant First Class before attending Officer Candidate School. Castro later earned his BBA from Campbell University in North Carolina.

Military career

Castro’s military career began in the summer of 1987.  He attended the Basic Airborne Course while enrolled in the ROTC program at the University of Puerto Rico. Castro also served as an infantryman in the Puerto Rico Army National Guard from 1988-1990. He then transferred to the active component of the U.S. Army, completing his first tour of duty in Co B, 1st Battalion, 87th Infantry.  During this time, he was deployed in support of Operation Desert Storm/Desert Shield.  Upon his return, he served with 101st Pathfinder Detachment at Fort Campbell, Kentucky.

In 1992, Castro was reassigned to Co E, (Long Range Surveillance), 51st Infantry in Darmstadt, Germany.  While in Germany, Castro deployed twice to Bosnia in support of Operations Joint Endeavor and Joint Forge.  In 1996, he reported to Co C, 3d Battalion, 75th Ranger Regiment and in 1998, Castro served as a drill sergeant at Co A, 2d Battalion, 19th Infantry at Sand Hill at Fort Benning, Georgia.

In 1999, he attended Special Forces Assessment and Selection and later that year began the Special Forces Qualification Course.  Upon graduation in 2000, he reported to Co B, 3d Battalion, 7th Special Forces Group (Airborne) at Fort Bragg, North Carolina. Castro's MOS was Special Forces Weapons Sergeant. While there, he deployed to Colombia, Belize, and Ecuador.

Castro went to night school to complete a B.A. degree, before attending the Army's Officers Candidate School. He attended Officer Candidate School in 2004, earning a second lieutenant commission the same year. He then attended the Infantry Officer basic course at Fort Benning, GA.  In 2005, he reported to Co D, 1st Battalion (Airborne), 325th Infantry Regiment  , 82d Airborne Division at Fort Bragg, NC.  While assigned to the 82d, he deployed to Afghanistan in support of Operation Enduring Freedom for the first parliamentary elections.

Deployment to Iraq

By the time he was sent to Iraq as a scout platoon leader with the 1st Battalion (Airborne), 325th Infantry Regiment, Castro was already an experienced combat veteran. In 2006, Castro was assigned to the 1st Battalion (Airborne), 325th Infantry Regiment  , 82d Airborne Division, which was in combat in Iraq at the time. In September 2006, Castro and his men had relieved other paratroopers atop a house in the town of Yusifiyah, some 20 miles southwest of Baghdad, after a night of fighting.

As an officer, Castro was not required to personally provide fire support to fellow soldiers in the exposed housetop position. Nonetheless, he volunteered for the mission and was accompanied by Sergeant Ralph Porras and Private First Class Justin Dreese. A mortar round landed a few feet away from him, killing Sergeant Porras and PFC Dreese and severely wounding Castro. Shrapnel tore through his body, damaging a shoulder, breaking an arm, fracturing facial bones and collapsing his lungs. The blast also drove the frame of his protective eyewear into his face.

Castro was sent to the National Naval Medical Center in Bethesda, Maryland. The top half of his right index finger was ripped off and the doctors had to amputate the remaining part of the finger. His right eye was blown out and he had a metal fragment in his left eye. The extent of his injuries was such that doctors doubted whether Castro would survive the week. When Castro regained consciousness days later, his right eye was gone, but doctors hoped to salvage the vision in his left. The surgeons later removed one last piece of shrapnel from that eye. When they took off his bandages they flashed a light for Castro to see; however, when he did not respond to the light, he was told that he would never see again. Castro remained in the hospital for two months after his injury, with no idea of what he would do next. He then overheard a doctor and a nurse discussing the next Army Ten-Miler and the Marine Corps Marathon. He asked his doctor if the courses were flat or hilly, then made running both races his goal.

Recovery
Castro spent 17 months in recovery before seeking a permanent assignment in the Army's Special Operations Command, at the 7th Special Forces Group's headquarters company in Fort Bragg. Through convalescence and rehabilitation, Castro  struggled to regain a measure of independence and regularly worked out – both running and in the gym.

New assignment
Before being appointed executive officer of the 7th Special Forces Group's headquarters company, he spent a weekend familiarizing himself with the group area where he was going to work by walking around and measuring the steps from his car to his office. He is quoted in the media as saying:

Upon his appointment, Castro became the only blind officer serving in the Special Forces and one of three blind officers who serve in the active-duty Army, though his managerial tasks are not directly involved with combat. In February 2008, Castro was promoted to the rank of captain, and served as the executive officer of the 7th Special Forces Group at Fort Bragg.

On December 15, 2009, Castro graduated from the Maneuver Captains Career Course at Fort Benning, Georgia. He is currently working as the Assistant Operations Officer/ Total Army Involvement Recruiting Coordinator at Fort Bragg, N.C.

Athletic endeavors

Castro has remained active as an athlete. At Bragg he trained with Major Phil Young, who was his team leader in the Special Forces, and has participated in several long distance road races, often being enthusiastically greeted by the audiences for his determination. He now  trains with Lieutenant Colonel Fred Dummar, who is his battalion commander. Together, they have completed several marathons. Among the notable races and marathons in which Castro has participated, with a guide, as a member of the "Missing Parts In Action" team in 2007, are the Army Ten-Miler and the Marine Corps Marathon. In 2008, he participated in the Bataan Memorial Death March Marathon in New Mexico, the Boston Marathon and the U.S. Air Force Marathon.

In 2008, Castro as a member and participant in Operation Peer Support, participated in the Blinded Veterans Association's 62nd National Convention. In June 2009, Castro participated in the Midnight Boogie 50 mile ultramarathon.

In 2014, he visited the South Pole with other wounded veterans and soldiers from the United States and Britain after intense hiking, skiing training.

Community service
Castro is an advocate of rehabilitation funding for the blind, visiting members of Congress in his quest. He was honored during a visit to the Charlie Norwood VA Medical Center in Augusta, Georgia with a plaque engraved in braille, which thanked him for his continued service. He also mentors, coaches, and counsels wounded service members with various injuries.  Recently, Castro was invited to be the keynote speaker at the 25th International Technology and Persons with Disabilities Conference.

Castro currently serves on active duty at the Special Operations Recruiting Battalion as the Assistant Operations Officer /Total Army Involvement Recruiting Coordinator. He has a 27-year-old son named Iván Eduardo.

Awards and decorations
Among Castro's military decorations are the following:

Medals and Awards
  Purple Heart
  Meritorious Service Medal
  Army Commendation Medal
  Joint Service Achievement Medal
  Army Achievement Medal
  Valorous Unit Award
  Meritorious Unit Commendation
  Superior Unit Award
  Army Good Conduct Medal
  National Defense Service Medal
  Armed Forces Expeditionary Medal
  Southwest Asia Service Medal
  Kosovo Campaign Medal
  Afghanistan Campaign Medal
  Iraq Campaign Medal
  Global War on Terrorism Service Medal
  Armed Forces Service Medal
  NCO Professional Development Ribbon
  Army Service Ribbon
  Army Overseas Service Ribbon
  NATO Medal
  Kuwait Liberation Medal (Saudi Arabia)
  Kuwait Liberation Medal (Kuwait)

Badges
  Combat Infantryman Badge with Star
  Expert Infantryman Badge
  Master parachutist badge
  Military Freefall Parachutist Badge
  Pathfinder Badge
  Air Assault Badge
  Drill Sergeant Identification Badge
Foreign badges
  German Parachutist Badge
  Canadian Parachutist Wings
Dutch Parachutist Badge
Colombian Jumpmaster Badge
Tabs
  Special Forces Tab
  Ranger tab
 Army Special Forces Combat Service Identification Badge
 Army Special Forces Distinctive Unit Insignia

See also

List of Puerto Ricans
List of Puerto Rican military personnel
Army Wounded Warrior Program

References

1967 births
United States Army personnel of the Kosovo War
American people of Puerto Rican descent
American blind people
Living people
People from Hoboken, New Jersey
Members of the United States Army Special Forces
National Guard (United States) officers
United States Army officers
Puerto Rican military officers
Puerto Rican Army personnel
United States Army personnel of the Iraq War